Davis reagent (3-phenyl-2-(phenylsulfonyl)-1,2-oxaziridine or 2-(benzenesulfonyl)-3-phenyloxaziridine) is a reagent used for oxidation in the Davis oxidation reaction, as well as oxidation of thiols to sulfones. It is named for Franklin A. Davis.

References

Reagents for organic chemistry